Graduados was an Argentine telenovela. It had several remakes:
Graduados, historias que no se olvidan, in Chile
Graduados (Colombian TV series), in Colombia